Dick Figures is an American adult animated series created by Ed Skudder and written, directed, and produced by Skudder and Zack Keller. The series, featuring two humanlike stick figures named Red and Blue who are best friends, aired for the first time on November 18, 2010. Episodes, which are typically under 4-minutes in length, are distributed on YouTube by Mondo Media. The series is aimed at mature audiences. In 2012, Keller was nominated for an Annie Award for Directing in an Animated Television/Broadcast Production for the episode titled "Kung Fu Winners".

The series, comprising over 50 episodes, has been viewed over 250 million times.

After raising $313,411 on Kickstarter, Dick Figures was eventually given a feature-length comedy adventure film, titled Dick Figures: The Movie. The 73-minute film became available on all major digital platforms on September 17, 2013.

Although some spin-off material was produced in 2015, the original run ended with the final episode of Season 5, "Figured Out", in July 2014.

Cast and characters

Main
Red (voiced by Ed Skudder) is a red-colored wild and crazy stick figure who is obsessed with partying, drinking, weapons, and sex. He lives in an apartment with Blue and often gets on his nerves. In the episode "Trouble Date", Red begins a relationship with the promiscuous Stacy and they both frequently ruin Blue and Pink's dates. Despite being in a relationship, Red is frequently seen having sex with other women. In the episode "First Day of Cool", it was revealed that he is an extraterrestrial being that came to Earth from a meteor. He crash-landed on the elementary school playground where he beat up the fifth-graders who were bullying Blue and instantly became friends with him. Red's antics often get him and Blue into trouble and he frequently insults Blue for his "nerdy" status, though he has on occasion shown how much he cares for Blue and values him as a friend, and always helps him out when needed. The special "Figured Out" episode reveals that his full name is Redward.
Blue (voiced by Zack Keller) a blue-colored stick figure is Red's pessimistic, levelheaded roommate and his best (and only) friend. Red's actions frequently annoy and exasperate Blue, though he is secretly envious of Red and wishes to be more like him. His hobbies include Dungeons & Dragons, comics and video games (which leads Red to frequently call Blue a "nerd"), and he displays a skill for hacking computers. Blue lives with Red in an apartment, and is often looking for jobs to pay the bills and rent, since Red never does. In the episode "Flame War", Blue gets a girlfriend named Pink. Their relationship becomes strained several times, usually through Red's actions, though they remain together for the rest of the series. The special "Figured Out" episode reveals that his full name is Blewis.

Supporting
Lord Tourettes (voiced by Ben Tuller) is a whimsical and effeminate larper with Tourette's syndrome, hence his name. He is a recurring character on the show who made his first appearance in the episode "Role Playas". He has constant outbursts of profane rage in his sentences, which he does not seem to care about. In the episode "Lord Tourette's Syndrome", it is revealed that him wearing his hat is the reason he constantly swears.
Pink (voiced by Shea Carter) is Blue's girlfriend. She is a recurring character who made her first appearance in the episode "Flame War" where she and Blue start a romantic relationship. Pink seems to be as serious as Blue is and has expressed her fair share of depression. She has a job and rarely gets time off. She constantly runs into problems with Blue, which mostly stem from Red ruining their dates together. It has been implied that Pink breaks up with him multiple times because of this. Pink is also easily fooled by Blue's attempts to be cultural (like passing off Japanese for French, and claiming chow mein is Chinese for spaghetti.) They did not share their first kiss until the end of the movie before confessing their love for each other, later getting married and having children. In the episode "A Hobbit of Thrones", it is revealed that Pink is best friends with Stacy and their relationship is similar to Red and Blue's.
Stacy (voiced by Lauren Kay Sokolov) is Red's girlfriend. She is a recurring character who made her first appearance in "Trouble Date". Stacy is a ditzy, promiscuous woman who has sex with many different men. Red and Stacy began their relationship in "Trouble Date" where they annoyed Pink and Blue on their date and ended up having sex on the restaurant table. Afterwards, Stacy did not appear again until the episode "Modern Flame War 3" where she had a different hairstyle and a job at Cybertime Systems. In the episode "Robot Frog", it was revealed that Stacy had dated Blue for two years before she started dating Red. In this episode, she was shown to be a sane, mature woman who dumped Blue because she believed that he was holding her back from what she truly wanted to be, which was a lascivious party girl, which is exactly what she became. In the episode "First Day of Cool", it was implied that her promiscuous nature came about after she consumed large amounts of Pixy Stix as a young child.
Mr. Dingleberry (named Nickelberry in "Kitty Amazing") (voiced by Ed Skudder) is Red and Blue's elderly landlord who made his first appearance in "Flame War". Dingleberry was a soldier in World War II and was a part of the Normandy landings. He is extremely frail, often seen hunched over and using a walking stick, and as such he is forgetful and suffers medical complications. He is annoyed by Red and Blue's antics, and often tries to get them to pay rent (but they never do). Despite being old, he attempts to be part of the cool kids, as he regularly joins raves and takes drugs. One of the main gags in the series is for Mr. Dingleberry to die in almost every episode he appears in.
Broseph (voiced by Mike Nassar) is an obnoxious, arrogant bully and nemesis of Red and Blue. Broseph made his first appearance in the episode "Zombies & Shotguns" where he was chainsawed to death by Red. Similar to Mr. Dingleberry, a running gag is for Broseph to die in almost every episode he appears in, which is usually caused by Red. In the episode "First Day of Cool", Broseph was shown to be the leader of a gang of fifth-graders as a child who bullied Blue. In this episode, Broseph and the rest of the fifth-graders were attacked and killed by Red when the latter debuted, saving Blue's life.

Other voices / guest stars

 Sarah Gencarelli
 Stephen M. Levinson
 Samantha Scharff
 Kate McCabe
 Eric Bauza
 John Dusenberry
 Rafael Hurtado
 Brendan Burch
 Brock Gallagher
 Dave Vamos
 Austin Madison
 Arlene Ramirez
 Lynn Wang
 Nick Ainsworth
 Nick Keller
 Andrea Fernandez
 Thomas Ridgewell
 Kenn Navarro

Episodes

Spin-off
Chick Figures is a spin-off series that premiered in June 2015. It features Lavender and Scarlet, Blue and Red's daughters (as revealed in the special episode "Figured Out"). Four episodes have been released so far. The series was first featured on Like, Share, Die and was later released on YouTube weeks later.

References

External links 
 

American flash animated web series
American adult animated comedy television series
American adult animated web series
2010s YouTube series
American comedy web series
Comedy-related YouTube channels
2010 web series debuts
English-language YouTube channels
YouTube channels launched in 2010
YouTube channels closed in 2015